Marie Tourell Søderberg (born 26 July 1988) is an actress known for 1864 (2014) and Itsi Bitsi (2015). She graduated from Lee Strasberg Theatre and Film Institute in New York in 2007 and finished her education at the Danish National School of Performing Arts in June 2012. 

She is also the author of Hygge – The Danish art of Happiness, a book written together with the journalist Kathrine Højte Lynggaard, interviewing Danes about their relationship to the phenomenon hygge.

Film

Television

References

External links

 
 Marie Tourell Søderberg at Filmdatabasen
 Marie Søderberg at Filmdatabasen
 Marie Søderberg at danskefilm.dk

1988 births
Living people
Danish child actresses
Danish film actresses
Danish television actresses
Danish voice actresses
21st-century Danish actresses